The Saturn AL-31 is a family of axial flow turbofan engines, developed by the Lyulka design bureau in the Soviet Union, now NPO Saturn in Russia, originally as a 12.5-tonne (122.6 kN, 27,560 lbf) powerplant for the Sukhoi Su-27 long range air superiority fighter. The AL-31 currently powers the Su-27 family of combat aircraft and some variants of the Chengdu J-10 multirole jet fighter. Assembly of the engine is also performed under license in India. Improved variants power the fifth-generation Sukhoi Su-57 and Chengdu J-20.

Development and design
The design of the AL-31 turbofan began in the 1970s under the designation izdeliye 99 by the Lyulka design bureau, also known as Lyulka-Saturn. With an emphasis on greater fuel efficiency over turbojets for longer range, the  class turbofan engine was intended to power the heavy PFI, which was being developed by Sukhoi as the T-10. The chief designer was Arkhip M. Lyulka, and after his death, Victor M. Chepkin. As the AL-31 was not yet ready for the first two T-10 prototypes in 1977, they were initially powered by modified AL-21F3 turbojet engines. The third prototype would be the first to install the AL-31. The T-10 design would be heavily revised into the T-10S, with T-10-7 being the first prototype of the improved design; the aircraft's aerodynamic refinements from changes in the outer shaping and packaging also resulted in the AL-31 gearbox changing to a top-mounted position. State tests of the AL-31 were completed in 1985, and the T-10 entering Soviet air services as the Su-27. The engine is manufactured at Ufa-based UMPO and Moscow-based Salyut.

After the collapse of the Soviet Union, design bureau and production plant distinctions realigned and gradually faded, and Lyulka-Saturn eventually merged with Rybinsk Motors to become NPO Saturn and was closely aligned with UMPO while Salyut became an independent entity; both Saturn and Salyut would make their own developments for the AL-31 family. Salyut also supplies AL-31 variants to fighters operated by the China. The J-10 uses the AL-31FN before newer variants transitioned to the domestic WS-10A, while the J-20 uses the AL-31FM2 as an interim engine until its intended WS-15 is ready. This reorganization would result in serious disputes between Saturn and Salyut over intellectual property rights and royalties over AL-31 sales to China.

The AL-31 was also used to assist Chinese engine designer and manufacturer Shenyang/Liming in developing the WS-10, with early examples directly using the AL-31F control system. According to Saturn's Victor M. Chepkin, chief designer of the 117 and 117S engines, the WS-10 was developed with the aid of the AL-31's maintenance technical documentation; this was recently confirmed by Aviation Industry Corporation of China (AVIC), the parent of Shenyang Aircraft Corporation.

Design
The base model AL-31F is a two-shaft axial-flow afterburning turbofan. The engine has a four-stage low-pressure compressor and a nine-stage high-pressure compressor, both driven by single stage turbines. The engine is controlled by the analogue KRD-99 unit, and can tolerate severely distorted air flow from the intake. The AL-31 has a modular design to facilitate maintenance and overhaul. In the twin-engine Su-27, left and right engines are interchangeable. Initially, the Mean Time Between Overhaul (MTBO) of the engine was only 100 hours, short of the required 300 hours. Later series incrementally improved the MTBO figure to 500 hours while service life was assigned as 1,500 hours. Further improved variants, such as the AL-31F Series 42, increased the MTBO to 1,000 hours with a full-life of 2,000 hours.

Further developments

Thrust vectoring
The AL-37FU and AL-31FP variants have thrust vectoring. The thrust vectoring nozzles could deflect ±15° in the vertical plane together for pitch or differentially for roll. After the engines reached the end of their service lives, the sole Su-37 was equipped with the normal AL-31F until it crashed in December 2002.

The research on thrust vectoring would be applied to the production AL-31FP used in the Sukhoi/Irkut Su-30MKI for India as well as further derivatives including the Su-30MKM for Malaysia and the Su-30SM for the Russian Air Force and Navy. The vectoring nozzle is used primarily in the pitch plane, but unlike the AL-37FU, the canting of the vectoring axes allow differential vectoring to produce roll and yaw moments as well. The AL-31FP nozzle has a time before overhaul of 500 hours, while the engine's MTBO is 1,000 hours, and both have a service life of 2,000 hours. AL-31FP is built by UMPO as well as in India by Hindustan Aeronautics Limited (HAL) at the Koraput facility under a deep technology transfer agreement.

Salyut developments

AL-31FN
Further production J-10 batches would eventually be equipped with the Shenyang/Liming WS-10A in lieu of the AL-31FN.

AL-31FM1, FM2, and FM3

Salyut also developed additional improved variants of the AL-31F with increased thrust and reliability. Additional enhancements include an improved core for greater turbine inlet temperature, and improved engine control system.

The AL-31FM2 is a further development of the AL-31FM1. Fan aerodynamics was further refined to increase its pressure ratio. The engine also incorporated improvements to the combustor and turbine blade aerodynamics and cooling for higher entry temperatures. The AL-31FM2 has a new full authority digital engine control (FADEC) with a hydromechanical backup. The engine has an MTBO of 1,000 hours and projected life increased to 3,000 hours. A version of the AL-31FM2 powers initial production batches of the Chengdu J-20 while later batches transitioned to the WS-10C; both of these engines are interim powerplants in place of the J-20's intended Xian WS-15.

The AL-31FM3 had been proposed as a potential powerplant for Sukhoi's T-50 PAK FA design but this was not pursued by Sukhoi, which instead chose Salyut rival NPO Saturn and its AL-41F1.

Salyut's developments of the AL-31 would result in serious disputes with Lyulka-Saturn's successor corporation NPO Saturn, which considers them unsanctioned and in violation of intellectual property rights.

Saturn developments

AL-41F1 (izdeliye 117)

Due to the decline of the Mikoyan Project 1.42/1.44 MFI fifth-generation fighter program in the 1990s, the Russian Defence Ministry initiated the PAK FA program for a more affordable next-generation multirole fighter, with the competition announced in 2001. As the designs would be smaller than the MFI, the original Lyulka-Saturn AL-41F design for the MiG 1.42/1.44 was too large. Instead, a deeply improved AL-31F derivative from Lyulka-Saturn (later NPO Saturn) designated the izdeliye 117 was contracted by Sukhoi for its T-50 design, which would eventually win the competition in 2002 and enter service in 2020 as the Su-57. First proposed by Saturn in 2001, the izdeliye 117, or AL-41F1, formally began development in April 2004 with contract signing by NPO Saturn.

While the AL-41F1 has the same overall architecture as the baseline AL-31, with a 4-stage low-pressure compressor (fan) and 9-stage high-pressure compressor and one-stage low pressure and one-stage high pressure turbines, the engine was deeply improved with up to 80% new parts and application of technology from the AL-41F. It has increased fan diameter, new high- and low-pressure turbines, provisions for thrust-vectoring nozzles similar to the AL-31FP, and a digital control system (FADEC) integrated into the aircraft's flight control system. The engine enables the Su-57 to achieve supersonic speed without afterburner, or supercruise, at Mach 1.3.

Following completion of state tests to meet Russian Air Force requirements, serial production of the AL-41F1 began in 2019 for installation in production Su-57 fighters supplied to the Russian Air Force and prospective foreign clients. A non-afterburning version of the AL-41F1 powers the Sukhoi S-70 Okhotnik unmanned combat aerial vehicle (UCAV). While the current Su-57 production tranches are powered by the AL-41F1, the aircraft is meant to be the basis for a family of stealth combat aircraft; future improved variants are planned to be powered by the Saturn izdeliye 30, a new design that fits into the same footprint as the AL-41F1.

AL-41F1S (izdeliye 117S)
To spread out development risks and associated costs with the fifth-generation PAK FA program, Sukhoi applied some of the technology, including the propulsion system, into a highly upgraded Su-27 variant, designated T-10BM (popularly called the Su-35BM), before being designated just as the Su-35. The aircraft's powerplant, the NPO Saturn izdeliye 117S, or AL-41F1S, is a slightly simplified derivative of the AL-41F1 from the Su-57, with the key difference being the separate engine control system of the AL-41F1S. The Su-35 and its AL-41F1S engines were originally developed by Sukhoi and Saturn internally for export, although the initial customer would be the Russia Defence Ministry. This engine weighs  dry and has an assigned life of 4,000 hours and an MTBO of 1,000 to 1,500 hours. The first flight of this engine was completed in an Su-35BM on 20 February 2008. On 9 August 2010, UMPO started supplying AL-41F1S intended for Su-35S fighters. The engine is also equipped on the Su-30SM2 as part of the upgrade plan to unify its systems with the Su-35S.

Variants

Specifications

AL-31F

AL-41F-1S (117S)

See also

References

Notes

References

External links

Russian Military Analysis - AL-31 F aircraft turbofan engine
AL-31F on LeteckeMotory.cz (cs,en)
AL-41F1A (117S) on LeteckeMotory.cz (cs,en)

AL-31
Low-bypass turbofan engines
1980s turbofan engines
AL-31